The 2017 Midwestern State Mustangs football team represented Midwestern State University in the 2017 NCAA Division II football season. They were led by head coach Bill Maskill, who is in his 16th season at Midwestern State. The Mustangs played their home games at Memorial Stadium and were members of the Lone Star Conference.

Schedule
Midwestern State announced its 2017 football schedule on January 26, 2017. The schedule consists of six home and four away games in the regular season. The Mustangs will host LSC foes Tarleton State, Texas A&M-Commerce, Texas A&M-Kingsville, West Texas A&M, and Western New Mexico and will travel to Angelo State, Eastern New Mexico, and Texas-Permian Basin.

The Mustangs will host one of the two non-conference games against Quincy from the Great Lakes Valley Conference and will travel to West Florida from the Gulf South Conference.

The game between Midwestern State and West Florida was cancelled in advance of the arrival of Hurricane Irma.

Rankings

References

Midwestern State
Midwestern State Mustangs football seasons
Lone Star Conference football champion seasons
Midwestern State Mustangs f